The Adona is a tributary of the river Peța in Romania. It flows into the Peța in Oradea.

References

Rivers of Romania
Rivers of Bihor County